Quxing  is a town situated in Kaifeng County, Kaifeng in the province of Henan, China.

See also
List of township-level divisions of Henan

References

Township-level divisions of Henan